The Spiral Starecase was an American pop band, best known for its 1969 single "More Today Than Yesterday".

The band, from Sacramento, California, United States, was recognizable for its horns and lead singer/guitarist Pat Upton's voice. The group also included Harvey Kaye (organ), Dick Lopes (saxophone), Bobby Raymond (bass guitar), Gene Austin (bass guitar), Vinny Parello (drums), Mark Barrett (drums) and Al Sebay (electric guitar).

Starting as the Fydallions, they released that song, one album, and a few more singles including "No One for Me to Turn To" after signing with Columbia.

The band had hits with "More Today Than Yesterday", released in January 1969, and the follow-up "She's Ready". "More Today Than Yesterday" has been covered by, among others, Sonny and Cher, Diana Ross, and Goldfinger, and was featured in the 1991 film My Girl, on the soundtrack of The Waterboy in 1998, and in an episode of Ally McBeal entitled "Silver Bells".

"More Today Than Yesterday" peaked at number 12 on the U.S. Billboard Hot 100 and number seven on the Cash Box Top 100. It is ranked as the 50th biggest U.S. hit of 1969. In Canada, it reached number six and is ranked as the 63rd biggest hit of the year.

History
The group evolved from a four-piece instrumental group called the Fydallions, which formed in 1964 in Sacramento, California, for an Air Force talent contest. After leaving the Air Force, the band went on the road, playing five-hour lounge jobs on the Las Vegas circuit. The Fydallions, by then a quintet consisting of Dick Lopes (saxophone), Bobby Raymond (bass guitar), Harvey Kaye (keyboards), Vinnie Parello (drums), and Pat Upton (guitar and lead vocals), were noticed by the A&R representative for Columbia Records, Gary Usher, while they were working in El Monte, California. Columbia signed the band, but insisted that they change their name. The band was renamed after the movie The Spiral Staircase, but with a deliberate misspelling.

Their first two singles, produced by Gary Usher, were regional successes in markets like Phoenix, Arizona. At this time, Sonny Knight was brought in to produce their first album. Usher had encouraged Upton to write original material for the group, and Upton had written "More Today Than Yesterday," while the band was working the Flamingo Sky Room in Las Vegas.

"Baby What I Mean", which was also released during 1968, and the two songs are on The Very Best of the Spiral Starecase.

About 18 months after the single's release, after releasing one album and a few more singles, the group disbanded due to poor management and squabbles over finances.

Upton went back to Los Angeles to work as a session musician, eventually working with Ricky Nelson.

Kaye returned to Las Vegas and reformed the band. That line-up featured Mike Caschera ( Michael Anthony) (lead vocals), Al Sebay (guitar), Gene Austin (electric bass), and Mark Barrett (drums). The band toured extensively and played every major venue in the United States, Canada, and Mexico in the late 1970s through the mid-1980s with a full horn section to replicate the sound of their biggest hits.

Raymond died in 1984. Kaye died on August 17, 2008 at the age of 69. Upton died on July 27, 2016, aged 75, after a long illness.

Discography

Albums

Compilation albums

Singles

See also
List of 1960s one-hit wonders in the United States

References

External links
Biography
Pat Upton interview

American pop music groups
Musical groups from Sacramento, California
Columbia Records artists
Musical groups established in 1964